Hyperion is a former settlement in Los Angeles County, California. Hyperion was a stop on the Pacific Electric Redondo Beach via Playa del Rey Line that lay at an elevation of 33 feet (10 m). 

Hyperion still appeared on USGS maps as of 1934. Hyperion Pier at this location existed from before 1912 to after 1937. The pier may have been the site of the outfall sewer into the ocean, as the wharf seemingly carried a redwood pipe  "out to a submerged end." According to an interview with one sanitation engineer, it was a "five-foot wooden pipe made just like a barrel, only straight strips. The reason I know this, a guy came down from Oregon representing the wood industry, and he wanted a piece of that pipe. He got permission from the city of Los Angeles to go up to the top and saw out a little piece. And they wanted to show how long a piece of wood would stand sewage infiltration."

See also
 Holton, California

 Hyperion sewage treatment plant

References

Former settlements in Los Angeles County, California
Former populated places in California